Diana Merry-Shapiro was a computer programmer for the Learning Research Group of Xerox PARC in the 1970s and 1980s, after having been hired originally as a secretary. As one of the original developers of the Smalltalk programming language, she helped to write the first system for overlapping display windows. Merry was also one of the co-inventors of the bit block transfer (BitBLT) routines for Smalltalk, subroutines for performing computer graphics operations quickly which were pivotal in the evolution of user interfaces from text-based user interfaces to graphical user interfaces.

As of 2003, Merry-Shapiro was still using Smalltalk as an employee of Suite LLC, a financial consulting firm.

References

Year of birth missing (living people)
Living people
American computer programmers
Scientists at PARC (company)